Stemphylium sarciniforme is a plant pathogen infecting lentil, red clover and chickpea.

References

External links 
 Index Fungorum
 USDA ARS Fungal Database

Fungal plant pathogens and diseases
Pulse crop diseases
Pleosporaceae